"Antigonish" is a poem by the American educator and poet, William Hughes Mearns, written in 1899. It is also known as "The Little Man Who Wasn't There" and was adapted as a hit song under the latter title.

Poem
Inspired by reports of a ghost of a man roaming the stairs of a haunted house, in Antigonish, Nova Scotia, Canada, the poem was originally part of a play called The Psyco-ed, which Mearns had written for an English class at Harvard University, circa 1899. In 1910, Mearns staged the play with the Plays and Players, an amateur theatrical group, and on March 27, 1922, the newspaper columnist FPA printed the poem in "The Conning Tower", his column in the New York World. Mearns subsequently wrote many parodies of this poem, giving them the general title of Later Antigonishes.

Song
In 1939 "Antigonish" was adapted as a popular song titled "The Little Man Who Wasn't There", by Harold Adamson with music by Bernie Hanighen, both of whom received the songwriting credits. A 1939 recording of the song by the Glenn Miller Orchestra, with vocals by Tex Beneke, became an 11-week hit on Your Hit Parade and reached #7. Other versions were recorded by Mildred Bailey & Her Orchestra, Larry Clinton & His Orchestra with vocals by Ford Leary and Bob Crosby & His Orchestra with vocals by Teddy Grace

Lil Wayne used a variation of the poem in his song "pick up your heart". In 2016 The Odd Chap released an Electro Swing version using soundtrack from the Glenn Miller Band recording. In 2018, the experimental industrial group The Reptile Skins released an EP entitled Antigonish with the two lead singers having a different interpretation of the poem. The opening verse is featured on the opening track "Ytterligare ett steg närmare total jävla utfrysning" off the album Halmstad by Swedish band Shining. In 2019, the YouTube channel Estela Naïad released a song adapted from the poem, with the composition of the main theme and the voice of Estela Naïad, the harmonies and choirs of Priscilla Hernández and the musical production of Naliam Cantero.

References to poem
 The Invisible Man (1975 TV series) Season 1, Episode 9. Dr. Daniel Westin quotes part of the poem.
 The poem is used in Stan Dane’s book Prayer Man: The Exoneration of Lee Harvey Oswald to allude to research that Lee Harvey Oswald was the "prayer man", a man standing on the front steps of the Texas School Book Depository filmed by Dave Wiegman of NBC-TV and Jimmy Darnell of WBAP-TV during the assassination of United States President John F. Kennedy.
 Father Brown: Season 9, Episode 9, "The Enigma of Antigonish," features the poem as both the inspiration for the criminal plot and a clue that helps resolve the crime.
 The Times's 19 October 2022 issue used the Poem facetiously in cartoon with "man" switched to "PM" - referring to former Prime Minister of the United Kingdom Liz Truss
 Horror podcast The Magnus Archives's episode 85, "Upon the Stair" is themed around the poem.
 Midsomer Murders’s season 5 episode 2, “A Worm in the Bud” John Nettles as DCI Tom Barnaby mentions a part of the poem to Daniel Casey as DS Gavin Troy.
Identity, the 2003 movie, begins and ends with the first few lines of this poem.
Fear the Walking Dead's season 3 episode 5, "Burning in Water, Drowning in Flame" references the poem as being Phil McCarthy's final (and only repeated words) after being scalped.

See also
Extensional and intensional definitions
Plato's beard
The Man Who Sold the World (song), a song by David Bowie

References

1899 poems
1922 poems
American poems
Works originally published in the New York World